ShredIt is designed to securely erase files in a variety of ways, using various overwriting patterns.  Originally released in 1998, Shredit is capable of erasing files on Mac OS 7 through Mac OS 10.8 and later, as well as Microsoft Windows 95 through Windows 7 and later and iOS(sublicensed by Burningthumb Software).  Versions of ShredIt are available for 10.6 and later through the macOS App Store, earlier and alternate versions are available through the Mireth website.

Features
Safeplace
Shredding by file, by folder or optical media

Overwriting Standards
DoD 5220 Clear & DoD 5220 Sanitize
DoE Secure Deletion
Gutmann 35 Way Overwrite
CD-RW Erasure

References

External links

Data erasure software
1998 software